Hintonia candens is a species of lanternfish found circumglobally in the southern oceans.  This species grows to a length of  SL.  This species is the only known member of its genus.

References
 

Myctophidae
Monotypic fish genera
Fish described in 1949
Taxa named by Alec Fraser-Brunner